Alahärmä is a former municipality of Finland. It was consolidated, together with Kortesjärvi and Ylihärmä, to Kauhava on 1 January 2009.

It is located in the province of Western Finland and is part of the Southern Ostrobothnia region.

Alahärmä stands in connection with the coast and the Gulf of Bothnia by the river Lapuanjoki. It was probably in combination with the fertile earth important for the first settlers in the area. The companies are mainly within the metal industry, fur-farming, starch and milk production. The unemployment rate is one of the lowest in Finland.

There is also a supply of cultural activities for instance the annual folk festival "Härmälääset Häjyylyt", theatre, art exhibitions, concerts. The local greystone church was built in 1903.

Alahärmä is also the home of the northernmost wooden rollercoaster in the world, named Thunderbird at PowerPark resort and amusement park. The resort area has also hotels, camping area, restaurants, the largest indoor go-kart track in Europe and The Mika Salo Circuit outdoor go-kart track (designed by Mika Salo)

Villages 
Ekola, Hakola, Hanhila, Hanhimäki, Hilli, Huhtamäki, Kennetti, Kirkonkylä, Kivihuhta, Kojola, Kuoppala, Köykkäri, Lahdenkylä, Ojala, Poromaa, Pelkkala, Perkiömäki, Pesola, Vakkuri, Voltti, Yliviitala

References

External links

 Power Park resort & Mika Salo Circuit
 Härmänmaa Museums

Populated places disestablished in 2009
2009 disestablishments in Finland
Former municipalities of Finland
Kauhava